This article attempts to list the oldest extant buildings in the state of Mississippi in the United States. Some dates are approximate and based upon dendochronology, architectural studies, and historical records. The area that is now Mississippi was originally inhabited by Native Americans. The city of Natchez was first established by French Colonists in 1716, and is one of the oldest and most historically important European settlements on the Mississippi River. The region was colonized and traded between French, Spanish, British, and American forces during the 1700s and a diverse architectural legacy remains visible in about ten surviving structures from that period.

To be listed here a building must:
date to Mississippi statehood in 1817 or prior; or
be the oldest building in a region, large city, or oldest of its type (government building, style, etc.)

List

Demolished early Mississippi buildings
Evan's Wall House, Fort Adams Mississippi

See also
List of the oldest buildings in the United States
History of Mississippi
List of the oldest buildings in Alabama
List of the oldest buildings in Florida
List of the oldest buildings in Louisiana
List of the oldest buildings in Tennessee
Timeline of architectural styles
List of National Historic Landmarks in Mississippi
National Register of Historic Places listings in Mississippi
List of Mississippi Landmarks

References

External links
 Mississippi Historical Society Website
 Mississippi Department of Archives and History

History of Mississippi
Mississippi

Oldest